Zain Abbasi (born 22 April 1987) is a Botswana cricketer. In May 2019, he was named in Botswana's squad for the Regional Finals of the 2018–19 ICC T20 World Cup Africa Qualifier tournament in Uganda. He made his Twenty20 International (T20I) debut for Botswana against Namibia on 22 May 2019.

References

External links
 

1987 births
Living people
Botswana cricketers
Botswana Twenty20 International cricketers
Place of birth missing (living people)